Johnathan Gregory Nalbone (born May 14, 1986) is a former American football tight end. He was drafted by the Miami Dolphins in the fifth round of the 2009 NFL Draft. He played college football at Monmouth. Nalbone was also a member of the Minnesota Vikings, Denver Broncos, Philadelphia Eagles, Cincinnati Bengals, Seattle Seahawks and Dallas Cowboys.

Professional career

Miami Dolphins
Nalbone was drafted by the Miami Dolphins in the fifth round (161st overall) of the 2009 NFL Draft. He was waived on October 31, 2009, but was re-signed to the team's practice squad on November 3. He spent the remainder of the 2009 season on the team's practice squad, and was re-signed to a future contract on January 7, 2010. Nalbone was waived by the Dolphins on September 21.

Minnesota Vikings
Nalbone was signed to the Minnesota Vikings' practice squad on September 28, 2010. He was released on October 13.

Denver Broncos
Nalbone was signed to the Denver Broncos practice squad on October 20. His practice squad contract expired at the conclusion of the season.

Philadelphia Eagles
Nalbone was signed to a future contract by the Philadelphia Eagles on January 11, 2011. He was waived on August 3.

Cincinnati Bengals
He was claimed off waivers by the Cincinnati Bengals on August 4, 2011. He was waived on September 3.

Denver Broncos (second stint)
The Denver Broncos signed him to their practice squad on September 20, 2011, only to be released on September 23.

Seattle Seahawks
The Seattle Seahawks signed him to their practice squad on November 16, 2011, they waived him on June 16, 2012

Dallas Cowboys
The Dallas Cowboys acquired him from the Seahawks waivers on June 19, 2012

External links
Philadelphia Eagles bio
Miami Dolphins bio
Monmouth Hawks bio

1986 births
Living people
Lawrence High School (New Jersey) alumni
Players of American football from Trenton, New Jersey
American football tight ends
Monmouth Hawks football players
Miami Dolphins players
Minnesota Vikings players
Denver Broncos players
Philadelphia Eagles players
Cincinnati Bengals players
Seattle Seahawks players
Dallas Cowboys players